The 1997 Dunhill Cup Malaysia was a friendly international football tournament held in Malaysia in 1997. It was won by China.

Groups

Group A

{| class=wikitable style="text-align:center"
|-
!width="300"|Team
!width="20"|
!width="20"|
!width="20"|
!width="20"|
!width="20"|
!width="20"|
!width="20"|
!width="20"|
|- style="background:#cfc;"
|align=left|
|3||3||0||0||7||2||+5||9
|- style="background:#cfc;"
|align=left|
|3||1||1||1||2||3||–1||4
|- 
|align=left|
|3||1||0||2||3||4||–1||3
|- 
|align=left|
|3||0||1||2||1||4||−3||1
|}

Group B

{| class=wikitable style="text-align:center"
|-
!width="300"|Team
!width="20"|
!width="20"|
!width="20"|
!width="20"|
!width="20"|
!width="20"|
!width="20"|
!width="20"|
|- style="background:#cfc;"
|align=left|
|3||2||1||0||8||2||+6||7
|- style="background:#cfc;"
|align=left|
|3||1||2||0||8||2||+6||5
|- 
|align=left|
|3||1||1||1||1||2||–1||4
|- 
|align=left|
|3||0||0||3||0||11||−11||0
|}

Knockout stage

Semifinals

Finals

Award

References

International association football competitions hosted by Malaysia